The Fort Point Channel Tunnel is a tunnel underneath the South Boston Streets and Fort Point Channel. It was built using a casting basin. It was built 1991–1994 in the Big Dig.

In July 2006, a ceiling tile and associated debris weighing 26 tons collapsed, causing the death of a passenger in a vehicle in the tunnel and severe injury to the driver. This incident and the resulting inspections and repairs delayed the Big Dig construction project by a year.

References

Tunnels in Boston